Bobov Dol Municipality is a municipality in Kyustendil Province, Bulgaria. The administrative centre is Bobov Dol.

Demography

Religion 
According to the latest Bulgarian census of 2011, the religious composition, among those who answered the optional question on religious identification, was the following:

References 

Municipalities in Kyustendil Province